Youth Against the EU is the youth wing of the People's Movement against the EU.

External links 
 Website

Youth wings of political parties in Denmark